Amblyomma is a genus of hard ticks. Some are disease vectors, for example the Rocky Mountain spotted fever in Brazil or ehrlichiosis in the United States.

This genus is the third largest in the family Ixodidae, with its species primarily occupying the torrid zones of all the continents. The centre of species diversity is on the American continent, where half of all the species occur. On this continent, Amblyomma species reach far beyond the torrid zone, up to the 40th parallel in the Northern Hemisphere, to the 50th parallel in the Southern Hemisphere, and even reaches the alpine zone of the Andes. They also occur in Eurasia, Africa and Australia.

Species

 Amblyomma albolimbatum Neumann, 1907
 Amblyomma albopictum Neumann 1899
 Amblyomma americanum Linnaeus, 1758 – lone star tick
Amblyomma anicornuta Apanaskevich & Apanaskevich, 2018
 Amblyomma antillorum Kohls 1969
 Amblyomma arcanum Karsch, 1879
 Amblyomma argentinae Neumann, 1905
 Amblyomma arianae Keirans & Garris, 1986
 Amblyomma astrion Dönitz, 1909
 Amblyomma aureolatum Pallas, 1772
 Amblyomma auricularium Conil, 1878
 Amblyomma australiense Neumann, 1905
 Amblyomma babirussae Schulze, 1933
 Amblyomma beaurepairei Vogelsang & Santos Dias 1953
 Amblyomma boeroi Nava, Mangold, Mastropaolo, Venzal, Oscherov and Guglielmone, 2009
 Amblyomma boulengeri Hirst & Hirst, 1910
 Amblyomma brasiliense Aragão, 1908
 Amblyomma breviscutatum Neumann, 1899
 Amblyomma cajennense Fabricius, 1787
 Amblyomma calabyi Roberts, 1963
 Amblyomma calcaratum Neumann, 1899
 Amblyomma chabaudi Rageau, 1964
 Amblyomma clypeolatum Neumann, 1899
 Amblyomma coelebs Neumann, 1899
 Amblyomma cohaerens Dönitz, 1909
 Amblyomma compressum Macalister, 1872
 Amblyomma cordiferum Neumann, 1899
 Amblyomma crassipes Neumann, 1901
 Amblyomma crassum Robinson, 1926
 Amblyomma crenatum Neumann 1899
 Amblyomma cruciferum Neumann, 1901
 Amblyomma darwini Hirst & Hirst, 1910
 Amblyomma dissimile Koch 1844
 Amblyomma dubitatum Neumann 1899
 Amblyomma eburneum Gerstäcker, 1873
 Amblyomma echidnae Roberts 1953
 Amblyomma elaphense Price, 1959
 Amblyomma exornatum Koch, 1844
 Amblyomma extraoculatum Neumann 1899
 Amblyomma falsomarmoreum Tonelli-Rondelli, 1935
 Amblyomma fimbriatum Koch, 1844
 Amblyomma flavomaculatum Lucas, 1846
 Amblyomma fulvum Neumann, 1899
 Amblyomma fuscolineatum Lucas, 1847
 Amblyomma fuscum Neumann, 1907
 Amblyomma geayi Neumann, 1899
 Amblyomma gemma Dönitz, 1909
 Amblyomma geochelone Durden, Keirans & Smith, 2002
 Amblyomma geoemydae Cantor, 1847
 Amblyomma gervaisi Lucas, 1847
 Amblyomma glauerti Keirans, King & Sharrad, 1994
 Amblyomma goeldii Neumann 1899
 Amblyomma hainanense Teng, 1981
 Amblyomma hebraeum Koch, 1844
 Amblyomma helvolum Koch, 1844
 Amblyomma hirtum Neumann, 1906
 Amblyomma humerale Koch, 1844
 Amblyomma imitator Kohls, 1958
 Amblyomma incisum Neumann, 1906
 Amblyomma inopinatum Santos Dias, 1989
 Amblyomma inornatum Banks, 1909
 Amblyomma integrum Karsch, 1879
Amblyomma interandinum Nava et al., 2014
 Amblyomma javanense Supino, 1897
 Amblyomma komodoense Oudemans, 1928
 Amblyomma kraneveldi Anastos, 1956
 Amblyomma laticaudae Warburton 1933
 Amblyomma latum Koch, 1844
 Amblyomma lepidum Dönitz, 1909
 Amblyomma limbatum Neumann, 1899
 Amblyomma loculosum Neumann, 1907
 Amblyomma longirostre Koch, 1844
 Amblyomma macfarlandi Keirans, Hoogstraal & Clifford, 1973
 Amblyomma macropi Roberts, 1953
 Amblyomma maculatum Koch, 1844
 Amblyomma marmoreum Koch, 1844
 Amblyomma mixtum Koch, 1844
 Amblyomma moreliae Koch, 1867
 Amblyomma moyi Roberts, 1953
 Amblyomma multipunctum Neumann, 1899
 Amblyomma naponense Packard, 1869
 Amblyomma near testudinis Lane & Poinar, 1986
 Amblyomma neumanni Ribaga 1902
 Amblyomma nitidum Hirst & Hirst, 1910
 Amblyomma nodosum Neumann, 1899
 Amblyomma nuttalli Dönitz, 1909
 Amblyomma oblongoguttatum Koch, 1844
 Amblyomma orlovi Kolonin, 1992
 Amblyomma oudemansi Neumann, 1910
 Amblyomma ovale Koch, 1844
 Amblyomma pacae Aragão, 1911
 Amblyomma papuanum Hirst, 1914
 Amblyomma parkeri Fonseca & Aragao, 1952
 Amblyomma parvitarsum Neumann, 1901
 Amblyomma parvum Aragão, 1908
 Amblyomma patinoi Nava, et al., 2014
 Amblyomma pattoni Neumann, 1910
 Amblyomma paulopunctatum Neumann 1899
 Amblyomma pecarium Dunn, 1933
 Amblyomma personatum Neumann, 1901
 Amblyomma pictum Neumann, 1906
 Amblyomma pilosum Neumann, 1899
 Amblyomma pomposum Dönitz, 1909
 Amblyomma postoculatum Neumann, 1899
 Amblyomma pseudoconcolor Aragão, 1908
 Amblyomma pseudoparvum Guglielmone, Mangold & Keirans, 1990
 Amblyomma quadricavum Schulze, 1941
 Amblyomma rhinocerotis de Geer, 1778
 Amblyomma robinsoni Warburton 1927
 Amblyomma rotundatum Koch 1844
 Amblyomma sabanerae Stoll, 1890
 Amblyomma scalpturatum Neumann, 1906
 Amblyomma sculptum Berlese, 1888
 Amblyomma scutatum Neumann, 1899
 Amblyomma soembawense Anastos, 1956
 Amblyomma sparsum Neumann, 1899
 Amblyomma sphenodonti Dumbleton, 1943
 Amblyomma splendidum Giebel, 1877
 Amblyomma squamosum Kohls, 1953
 Amblyomma supinoi Neumann, 1905
 Amblyomma sylvaticum de Geer, 1778
 Amblyomma tapirellum Dunn, 1933
 Amblyomma testudinarium Koch, 1844
 Amblyomma tholloni Neumann, 1899
 Amblyomma tigrinum Koch 1844
 Amblyomma tonelliae Nava et al., 2014
 Amblyomma torrei Pérez Vigueras, 1934
 Amblyomma transversale Lucas, 1845
 Amblyomma triguttatum Koch 1844
 Amblyomma trimaculatum Lucas, 1878
 Amblyomma triste Koch 1844
 Amblyomma tuberculatum Marx, 1894
 Amblyomma usingeri Keirans, Hoogstraal & Clifford, 1973
 Amblyomma varanense Supino, 1897
 Amblyomma variegatum Fabricius 1794
 Amblyomma varium Koch, 1844
 Amblyomma vikirri Keirans, Bull & Duffield, 1996
 Amblyomma williamsi Banks, 1924

Fossil species 

 Amblyomma birmitum Chitimia-Dobler et al., 2017 Burmese amber, Myanmar, Cenomanian

References

External links
 http://www.fao.org/ag/aga/agah/pd/pages/ticksp2.htm
  Amblyomma variegatum   on the UF / IFAS Featured Creatures Web site

 
Arachnids of South America
Ixodidae
Acari genera
Taxa named by Carl Ludwig Koch